Edge Glacier is a small cliff-type glacier draining northward into Davis Valley in northeast Dufek Massif, Pensacola Mountains. It was mapped by the United States Geological Survey from surveys and U.S. Navy air photos, 1956–66, and was named by the Advisory Committee on Antarctic Names for Joseph L. Edge, a photographer with U.S. Navy Squadron VX-6 on Operation Deep Freeze 1963 and 1964.

See also
 List of glaciers in the Antarctic
 Glaciology

References 

Glaciers of Queen Elizabeth Land